Phra Chom Klao Railway Halt is a railway halt of eastern railway line located in the campus of  King Mongkut's Institute of Technology Ladkrabang (KMITL), Lat Krabang Subdistrict, Lat Krabang District, eastern Bangkok.

It is 30.33 km (18 mi) from Hua Lamphong (Bangkok railway station) and is 830 m (2,723 ft) away from the next station, Hua Takhe.

The halt bisects university and nearest Faculty of Engineering.

In the summer (March–April), the scenery of this halt is very beautiful. Due to the pink trumpet tree will bloom at the same time. Therefore used as a place to take photos of young people.

Train services 
 Ordinary train No. 275/276 Bangkok - Aranyaprathet - Bangkok
 Ordinary train No. 277/278 Bangkok - Kabin Buri - Bangkok
 Ordinary train No. 279/280 Bangkok - Aranyaprathet - Bangkok
 Ordinary train No. 281/282 Bangkok - Kabin Buri - Bangkok
 Ordinary train No. 283/284 Bangkok - Ban Phlu Ta Luang - Bangkok
 Ordinary train No. 285/286 Bangkok - Chachoengsao Junction - Bangkok
 Ordinary train No. 367/368 Bangkok - Chachoengsao Junction - Bangkok
 Ordinary train No. 371/372 Bangkok - Prachin Buri - Bangkok
 Ordinary train No. 376/378 Rangsit - Hua Takhe - Bangkok
 Ordinary train No. 379/380 Bangkok - Hua Takhe - Bangkok
 Ordinary train No. 381/382 Bangkok - Chachoengsao Junction - Bangkok
 Ordinary train No. 383/384 Bangkok - Chachoengsao Junction - Bangkok
 Ordinary train No. 385/386 Bangkok - Chachoengsao Junction - Bangkok
 Ordinary train No. 389/390 Bangkok - Chachoengsao Junction - Bangkok
 Ordinary train No. 391/394 Bangkok - Chachoengsao Junction - Bangkok

Citations

References 

Railway stations in Thailand